The Eurovision Song Contest 2008 was the 53rd edition of the Eurovision Song Contest. Organised by the European Broadcasting Union (EBU) and host broadcaster Radio Television of Serbia (RTS), the contest was held at the Belgrade Arena, and (for the first time) consisted of two semi-finals on 20 and 22 May, and a final on 24 May 2008. The three live shows were presented by Serbian television presenter Jovana Janković and musician Željko Joksimović.

Forty-three countries participated in the contest, the highest ever number of participants in the contest beating the record of forty-two set the year before. Azerbaijan and San Marino participated for the first time, while Austria did not participate, mainly due to questions on the semi-final organisation as well as the politicization of the contest.

The winner was Russia with the song "Believe", performed by Dima Bilan who wrote it with Jim Beanz. Ukraine, Greece, Armenia and Norway rounded out the top five. Armenia achieved their best result to date this year. Of the "Big Four" countries Spain placed the highest, finishing sixteenth, while the United Kingdom ended up in last place for the second time in their Eurovision history, after .

The official website, eurovision.tv, streamed national finals for this year's contest live on ESCTV for the first time. Furthermore, for the first time the winner has been awarded the perpetual glass microphone trophy of the Eurovision Song Contest. The trophy is a handmade piece of sandblasted glass in the shape of a 1950s microphone.

Location

Venue 
Serbia gained the right to host the contest after Marija Šerifović won the 2007 contest in Helsinki, Finland. Since Serbia was the winner of the preceding contest, the 2008 contest was subsequently held there. The Belgrade Arena in Belgrade was chosen as the venue for the contest, and is among the largest indoor arenas in Europe, with a total capacity of 25,000 seats.

On 14 September 2007, the Mayor of Helsinki handed over the "Eurovision keys" to the Deputy of Belgrade. This ceremony is meant to be a tradition from the 2008 contest and onward, and the ring contains a key from every city that has ever hosted the competition.

Potential change of location 
Following the unilateral Kosovo declaration of independence from Serbia on 17 February 2008, which has resulted in protests and unrest across the country, the location of the event was considered to be changed. Ukraine was considered an option since they came second in Eurovision Song Contest 2007. YLE were another option, as they hosted the previous year's competition in Helsinki, Finland. Greece's Ellinikí Radiofonía Tileórasi (ERT) also offered the EBU to host the contest in Athens, Greece again. It was later decided that the contest would stay in Belgrade, with the EBU giving support. RTS would gain a guarantee of safety and security from the government of Serbia for all visitors and participants of the contest. The delegations of Albania, Croatia and Israel had special security. In the end, the contest was held without any incidents.

Visual design 

RTS ran a competition that led to the creation of the 2008 contest's branding, logo and the stage. The theme of the contest was based around the "confluence of sound". This was symbolic as Belgrade lies on the confluence of two European rivers, the Sava and Danube. The logo chosen, a treble clef, formed the graphical basis of the design created by Boris Miljković.

The postcards in the first and second semi-final were based around the creation of the flag of the nation that was to perform next. Each post card had a short story related to each country and its people. During each postcard a short letter was displayed. All were in the national language of the artist's country, with the exception of the Serbian postcard, which consisted of "Welcome to Belgrade" and "Welcome to Serbia" in various languages and the Belgian postcard which was written in the constructed language the Belgian group performed in. The postcards were brought to an end by a stamp with this year's Eurovision logo.

According to RTS the stage represented native identities, history and modern themes, symbols and universally recognised messages. The confluence-themed stage also contained a large number of television and LCD display screens. The stage had settings for all new electronic possibilities including some movable parts of the stage. It was designed by Chicago-based David Cushing.

The first semi-final was created around a city theme. The contest opened with a panorama of the city of Belgrade forming in the stage's background with two waves sliding down the stage to meet in the centre – at the confluence, the overall theme of the contest.

The second semi-final was based around the theme of water, which was enhanced by the look of the stage during the interval act where the water formed the main colours of the stage.

The grand final was based on the theme of the confluence. Construction of the stage lasted several days and was carried out by various teams from across Europe. Pyrotechnics were heavily used for the entries from Armenia, Azerbaijan, Finland, Germany, Turkey, the Czech Republic, Bulgaria and Switzerland. The stage received positive feedback from the media and fans describing it as "one of the best looking stages in the history of the competition".

Format 

At a press conference in Helsinki in May 2007, Svante Stockselius, executive supervisor of the contest for the EBU, announced that the competition's format may be expanded to two semi-finals in 2008 or 2009. On 28 September 2007 it was announced that the EBU had approved the plan of hosting two semi-finals in 2008.

Based on research conducted by the EBU's tele-voting partner Digame, the semi-finalists were sorted into the two heats through the drawing of lots, which was seeded to keep countries that have a significant history of voting for each other apart. Each broadcaster had to broadcast the semi-final in which they took part, with the broadcasting of the other semi-final being optional. The draw for the semi-final allocation occurred in the City Assembly of Belgrade on Monday 28 January 2008 at 13:00 CET and was conducted by the hosts of the contest Jovana Janković and Željko Joksimović.

First, two envelopes with 'Semi-Final 1' and 'Semi-Final 2' were drawn. Then, three countries from each pot were chosen randomly to take part in the first semi-final and the other three in the second one. The country left in Pot 5 took part in the first envelope that is drawn. While, the country left in Pot 6 in the second one.

The automatic grand finalist countries chose whether they would broadcast both semi-finals or just one, but viewers from these countries could only vote in one. From the draw conducted, it was decided which of the five grand finalist countries would broadcast and have voting rights in either of the events. The semi-finals were webcast live through Eurovision.tv. The top nine songs from the televoting qualified for the grand final, and a tenth was determined by the back-up juries. Twenty-five songs competed in the grand final.

Semi-final allocation 

On 24 January 2008, all 38 countries in the semi-finals were separated into the following pots based on voting history and geographical location:

Running order 

The draw to decide the running order of the songs in each semi-final and the grand final was conducted at the Heads of Delegation meeting on 17 March 2008.

Participating countries 

On 21 December 2007, the EBU confirmed that 43 countries would be present in Belgrade. San Marino, as well as the newest EBU member, Azerbaijan, made its debut at the 2008 contest. Austria did not compete; its broadcaster, ORF, said "we've already seen in 2007 that it's not the quality of the song, but the country of origin that determines the decision."

Automatic grand finalists Germany and Spain exercised voting rights at the first semi-final. France, the United Kingdom and Serbia exercised voting rights at the second semi-final. Spain and France each broadcast only the semi-final in which they participated; Germany, Serbia and the UK screened both semi-finals (with Germany broadcasting on a delay).

Returning artists 
Bold indicates a previous winner.

Semi-final 1 
The first semi-final was held on 20 May 2008. Germany and Spain voted in this semi-final.

Semi-final 2 
The second semi-final was held on 22 May 2008. The United Kingdom, France and Serbia voted in this semi-final.

Final 
The grand finalists were:
 the host country ;
 the top nine countries from the first semi-final plus one wildcard from the juries;
 the top nine countries from the second semi-final plus one wildcard from the juries.

The grand final was held on 24 May 2008 and was won by Russia.

Detailed voting results

Semi-final 1

12 points 
Below is a summary of all 12 points in the first semi-final:

Semi-final 2

12 points 
Below is a summary of all 12 points in the second semi-final:

Final

12 points 
Below is a summary of all 12 points in the grand final:

Spokespersons 

The voting order and spokespersons during the grand final were as follows:

 Carrie Grant
 Ognen Janeski
 Marysya Horobets
 Thomas Hermanns
 Anna Sahlene
 Melina Garibović
 Leon Menkshi
 
 Roberto Moretti
 Kristīne Virsnīte
 Valentina Voykova
 
 Noa Barak-Weshler
 Hristina Marouhou
 Vitalie Rotaru
 
 Cyril Hanouna
 Alina Sorescu
 Sabrina
 Stian Barsnes-Simonsen
 Éva Novodomszky
 
 
 Peter Poles
 Hrachuhi Utmazyan
 Petra Šubrtová
 
 Esther Hart
 Meltem Ersan Yazgan
 Moira Delia
 Niamh Kavanagh
 
 Leyla Aliyeva
 
 Mikko Leppilampi
 Barbara Kolar
 Björn Gustafsson
 Olga Barabanschikova
 
 Oxana Fedorova
 Nina Radulović
 Tika Patsatsia

Broadcasts 

Most countries sent commentators to Belgrade or commentated from their own country, in order to add insight to the participants and, if necessary, provide voting information.

High-definition broadcasts 

RTS broadcast the event in 1080i high-definition (HD) and 5.1 surround sound. The new high-definition television system was in place at the Belgrade Arena by April 2008. This is the second year that the event was broadcast live in HD. BBC HD broadcast the contest in High Definition in the United Kingdom. Swedish broadcaster SVT broadcast both the semi-final and the grand final on SVT HD. Lithuanian broadcaster LRT broadcast both the semi-final and the grand final in 1080i high-definition (HD) on their channel LTV. The same occurred on Swiss HD channel HD suisse; on this channel viewers were able to choose the language of the commentary while viewing a semi-final or grand final of the Eurovision Song Contest. However, all other countries broadcast the show only in standard definition, and the event will only be available to buy on a standard-definition DVD; it will not be released on HD-DVD or Blu-ray.

International broadcasts 

  – Although Australia was not eligible to enter, the contest was broadcast on SBS. The first semi-final was broadcast on Friday 23 May at 19:30 local time, with the second semi-final on Saturday 24 May 2008 at 19:30 local time, and the Final on Sunday 25 May 2008 at 19:30 local time, amongst a weekend of Eurovision-themed programming. SBS local host Julia Zemiro provided introductory and concluding segments with SBS otherwise broadcasting the BBC's coverage and commentary. In recent years the contest has been one of SBS's highest-rating programmes in terms of viewer numbers. The grand final rated well for SBS with 427,000 viewers tuning in for the grand final with 421,000 for the second semi-final and 272,000 for the first semi-final.
 – In Austria, ORF broadcast the contest live and received high TV ratings. However, it did not broadcast the semi-finals on 20 and 22 May.
  – Gibraltar screened only the final on GBC.
  – No Italian broadcaster proper showed the contest, but San Marinese SMRTV, which broadcast live the full event on both TV and radio, is available in some parts of Italy: Romagna (and a small part of Emilia, including Bologna), northern Marche, and southern Veneto, including Venice.

A live broadcast of the Eurovision Song Contest was available worldwide via satellite through European streams such as TVRi, ERT World, ARMTV, TVE Internacional, TRT International, TVP Polonia, RTP Internacional, RTS Sat and SVT Europa. The official Eurovision Song Contest website also provided a live stream without commentary via the peer-to-peer medium Octoshape.

Other awards 
In addition to the main winner's trophy, the Marcel Bezençon Awards and the Barbara Dex Award were contested during the 2008 Eurovision Song Contest. The OGAE, "General Organisation of Eurovision Fans" voting poll also took place before the contest.

Marcel Bezençon Awards 
The Marcel Bezençon Awards, organised since 2002 by Sweden's then-Head of Delegation and 1992 representative Christer Björkman, and 1984 winner Richard Herrey, honours songs in the contest's final. For the only time, the awards were divided into four categories: Artistic Award which was voted by previous winners of the contest, Composers Award, Poplight Fan Award which was voted by fans on the Swedish website poplight.se, and Press Award.

OGAE 
OGAE, an organisation of over forty Eurovision Song Contest fan clubs across Europe and beyond, conducts an annual voting poll first held in 2002 as the Marcel Bezençon Fan Award. After all votes were cast, the top-ranked entry in the 2008 poll was Sweden's "Hero" performed by Charlotte Perrelli; the top five results are shown below.

Barbara Dex Award 
The Barbara Dex Award is a humorous fan award given to the worst dressed artist each year. Named after Belgium's representative who came last in the 1993 contest, wearing her self-designed dress, the award was handed by the fansite House of Eurovision from 1997 to 2016 and is being carried out by the fansite songfestival.be since 2017.

Official album 

Eurovision Song Contest: Belgrade 2008 was the official compilation album of the 2008 contest, put together by the European Broadcasting Union and released by EMI Records and CMC International on 12 May 2008.The album featured all 43 songs that entered in the 2008 contest, including the semi-finalists that failed to qualify into the grand final.

Charts

Notes and references

Notes

References

External links 

 Eurovision Song Contest
 RTS Evrosong 
 Official Serbian Eurovision website 

 
2008
Music festivals in Serbia
2008 in Serbia
2000s in Belgrade
Radio Television of Serbia original programming
Music in Belgrade
2008 song contests
May 2008 events in Europe
Events in Belgrade